Kuşalanı is a town in Samandağ district of Hatay Province, Turkey. At  it is on the state highway  connecting Samandağ to Antakya (capital of the province). The population of Kuşalanı was 5259  as of 2012.

References

Populated places in Hatay Province
Towns in Turkey
Samandağ District